Rowgir-e Taj Amiri (also Romanized as Rūgīr-e Tāj Amīrī) is a village in Kheyrgu Rural District, Alamarvdasht District, Lamerd County, Fars Province, Iran. At the 2006 census, its population was 154, in 28 families.

References 

Populated places in Lamerd County